"Love This Life" is a song by the American hip hop recording artist T.I., released on April 3, 2012, as the intended first single from his eighth studio album, Trouble Man: Heavy is the Head (2012). The song, thematically reminiscent of his 2008 hit single "Whatever You Like", was produced by production team 1500 or Nothin'. The song was included on the album as an iTunes bonus track only.

Music video
The music video was premiered on June 14, 2012, on 106 & Park. The video was shot in Sydney, Australia.

Composition
The hip hop song's hook contains 'layered' singing vocals by T.I., very similar to "That's All She Wrote", a previous single released by T.I. featuring fellow rapper Eminem, also known for often using layered singing vocals. T.I. told XXL that the song speaks to women, "but from a man’s perspective". He described the song's concept saying, "People who find themselves in a situation where the woman might say she wants to part ways with the man, but the man [is] like, 'Let’s be sensible about this. You gonna leave all this? And go where?'" While T.I. incorporates references to cars, shoes and jewelry, he also expresses the desire to have an understanding relationship.

Critical reception
Markman compared T.I.'s delivery to that on "Whatever You Like", only "much darker".
Trent Fitzgerald of PopCrush called it "a great rap ballad that could make the toughest neighborhood thug want to buy candy and flowers for his girlfriend."

Charts

Release history

References

External links
 
 

2012 singles
T.I. songs
Songs written by T.I.
Grand Hustle Records singles
Atlantic Records singles
2012 songs
Songs written by Larrance Dopson
Songs written by Lamar Edwards